The John G. Ayling House is a historic house located at 223 DeWitt Street in the Sedgwick neighborhood of Syracuse, Onondaga County, New York.

Description and history 
It was designed by architect Ward Wellington Ward (1875–1932) and built in 1915. It is a two-story, Tudor Revival style asymmetrical dwelling. It is sheathed in stucco and half-timbering and has a steep cross-gabled roof. The house features diamond paned and leaded glass windows and American Craftsman inspired Moravian tiles.

It was listed on the National Register of Historic Places on May 6, 2011.

In 2015, the house was bought by writers Jonathan Dee and Dana Spiotta, who began residing there.

References

Further reading
 

Houses on the National Register of Historic Places in New York (state)
Tudor Revival architecture in New York (state)
Houses completed in 1915
Houses in Syracuse, New York
National Register of Historic Places in Syracuse, New York